The following lists events that happened during 2012 in the Federal Democratic Republic of Ethiopia.

Incumbents
President: Girma Wolde-Giorgis
Prime Minister: Meles Zenawi (until August 20), Hailemariam Desalegn (starting August 20)

Events
 January 17 - Unknown assailants kill 2 Hungarians, 2 Germans and an Austrian in northeastern Ethiopia.
 January 25 - A truck bomb detonates at an Ethiopian military base in Somalia.
 January 28 - The African Union opens its new headquarters in Addis Ababa.

References

 
2010s in Ethiopia
Ethiopia
Ethiopia
Years of the 21st century in Ethiopia